Radio Alhara is a Palestinian online radio station broadcasting from Bethlehem since its launch in March 2020. The station grew in public notoriety when it launched a solidarity campaign with protests surrounding the Sheikh Jarrah controversy, which it termed the "Sonic Liberation Front."

In addition to radio shows broadcast in solidarity with international movements for self-determination, the station raises awareness around the civil and human rights issues facing Palestinians living under Israeli occupation. Radio Alhara has received support from a global coalition of musicians and its shows have been syndicated on stations internationally. The station has also organized a fundraising campaign for relief following the 2020 Beirut explosion and broadcast shows in solidarity with Mahsa Amini protests in Iran.

References

Internet radio stations
Radio stations established in 2020